"Así es la Vida" ("That's Life") is a song performed by Nicaraguan salsa singer Luis Enrique on his 1994 self-titled studio album of the same name. It was written by Omar Alfanno and released as the second single from the album. Lyrically, the song takes on a "humanistic tale". Its music video was filmed in Miami Beach and was nominated for Video of the Year at the 1995 Lo Nuestro Awards.

Charts

Weekly charts

Year-end charts

See also
List of Billboard Tropical Airplay number ones of 1994 and 1995

References

1994 singles
1994 songs
Luis Enrique (singer) songs
Sony Discos singles
Spanish-language songs